William Leslie "Les" Ingman (17 August 1927 – October 1990) was a British cyclist who competed in the 1952 Summer Olympics.

He was born in Barrow-in-Furness, and died in Hounslow. He represented the Apollo Cycling Club. Participating in the road race of cycling at the 1952 Summer Olympics, he failed to finish the race, and thus became a non-scoring member of the British team. He won the British National Hill Climb Championships in 1954 and 1956.

References

1927 births
1990 deaths
Sportspeople from Barrow-in-Furness
English male cyclists
Cyclists at the 1952 Summer Olympics
Olympic cyclists of Great Britain